Francesco Cura (born 7 March 1977), is an American actor, singer, and fashion model. Sometimes credited as Francis J. Cura or Francesco Maria Cura, he has starred in feature films such as Hannah Can't Swim,  Singularity, The Deep and Dreamless Sleep, and The Wizards Return: Alex vs. Alex. He has also guest starred in such series as Criminal Minds and Scrubs.

Biography
Francesco Cura was born in Parma, Italy but spent much of his youth traveling between Italy and the United States.  His father, Arturo Cura, is an Italian painter, author and independent film director.  Francesco was immersed in the arts from a young age and often appeared in his father's television and stage productions.  He has one sister, Valentina Cura, who is also an artist.

Cura studied art history, graphic design, sculpting, portraiture, typography and lithography at the prestigious Institute of Arts P. Toschi in Parma and graduated with honors.  He then moved to Milan to work as a male fashion model and enrolled in a classical vocal training program for Opera where he developed a four-octave vocal range.

In 1998 Cura moved to New York City where he studied acting at the Lee Strasberg Theatre and Film Institute.  Following his move, he began to appear in numerous stage productions and, after moving to Los Angeles in 2003, primarily in film and television roles.

Partial filmography
Criminal Minds (2008) (US TV)
Singularity
The Deep and Dreamless Sleep
Scrubs (2003) (US TV)
 Hannah Can't Swim (2002)
 The Swamp (2012) (US TV) Episodes: Traffic Jam (2012) The Hike (2012)
 JoyCamp (TV Series) Episodes: Illuminate with Fluoride (2012) P.S.A. Conspiracy Theorist (2012)
 The Book of Daniel (credited as Francis J. Cura) (2013)
 The Wizards Return: Alex vs. Alex (TV Movie) (2013)
 Bridget Jones's Baby (2016) (as Sexy Santa)

References

External links
Most Beautiful Men, Francesco Cura
Cisoto Photos, photos of Francesco Cura
Photos and Profile
 
 Photos and Profile

1977 births
21st-century American male actors
Italian emigrants to the United States
American male models
American male film actors
American male television actors
Living people
Actors from Parma
Male actors from New York City
21st-century American singers
21st-century American male singers